He's a Honey is a 1932 short musical comedy film directed by Walter Graham. It stars Harry Barris and features Helen Mann, Eleanor Hunt, and Edgar Kennedy. Its working title was Wedding Night.

Plot
Harry Barris plays a sought-after bandleader who wants to marry Helen Mann's character. Her father, played by Edgar Kennedy, disapproves. Nevertheless, she is won in the end.

Cast
Harry Barris as a bandleader
Helen Mann as his love interest
Edgar Kennedy as her father
Eleanor Hunt as a girl
Bobby Vernon as a heavy
Eddie Baker
George Waggner

Reception
"This is for ardent Harry Barris fans only," a critic wrote for Photoplay. It was written in Motion Picture Herald that Harry Barris was "a far better musician than comedian." However, the critic strongly praised Edgar Kennedy's performance. Screenland described it as a "peppy song-and-dance comedy, with Harry making a personal hit in it." Bobby Vernon's role as a heavy was a change of pace compared to his earlier roles. "He gained a howl when he said 'Scram' in a deep basso voice—it came as such a surprise in a tense moment," wrote a critic for Hollywood Filmograph.

References

External links

1932 films
American black-and-white films
American musical comedy films
1932 musical comedy films
1930s American films
1930s English-language films